Vladimir Alekseyevich Shutov (born 17 November 1971) is a former Russian football player.

Shutov played in the Russian Premier League with FC KAMAZ-Chally Naberezhnye Chelny.

References

1971 births
Living people
Soviet footballers
Russian footballers
FC KAMAZ Naberezhnye Chelny players
Russian Premier League players
Association football forwards